Auratonota moronana is a species of moth of the family Tortricidae. It is found in Ecuador.

The wingspan is about 22.5 mm. The ground colour of the forewings is whitish, with shining dots and pale ferruginous median suffusions. The markings are pale ferruginous with rust suffusions. The hindwings are creamy white, tinged yellowish terminally.

References

Moths described in 2000
Auratonota
Moths of South America